Slip Stitch and Pass is the second official live album by the American rock band Phish. It was released on October 28, 1997, by Elektra Records and has nine tracks from the band's March 1, 1997, show at the Markthalle Hamburg in Hamburg, Germany, which was part of Phish's 1997 European Tour.

The album marked the first time that concert staples "Mike's Song" and "Weekapaug Groove" had appeared on an official Phish release, despite both having been part of the band's repertoire since the 1980s. Three of the album's nine songs are cover songs: "Cities" from Talking Heads, "Jesus Just Left Chicago" from ZZ Top and the traditional a cappella standard "Hello My Baby".

In addition, during the final jam segment of "Mike's Song", the band quotes (or 'teases') Pink Floyd's "Careful with That Axe, Eugene" and elements and lyrics from The Doors song "The End". Both "Lawn Boy" and "Weekapaug Groove" subsequently have lyrics from "The End". The close of "Weekapaug Groove" interpolates the end section of the Rolling Stones' "Can't You Hear Me Knocking".

The jam on "Wolfman's Brother" is indicative of the band's foray into funk music, which dominated the group's improvisation over the next several years. The song also includes a tease of the band's own instrumental tune "Dave's Energy Guide."

Renowned graphic artist Storm Thorgerson designed the album cover.

Track listing

Set list

Personnel
Phish
Trey Anastasio – guitars, lead vocals, a cappella vocals on "Hello My Baby"
Page McConnell – keyboards, backing vocals, lead vocals on "Jesus Just Left Chicago" and "Lawn Boy", a cappella vocals on "Hello My Baby"
Mike Gordon – bass guitar, backing vocals, lead vocals on "Weigh" and "Mike's Song", a cappella vocals on "Hello My Baby"
Jon Fishman – drums, backing vocals, co-lead vocals on "Taste", a cappella vocals on "Hello My Baby"

Charts

References

External links
Phish.net Setlists: 1997-03-01 - Full setlist and notes for the March 1, 1997 show

Albums with cover art by Storm Thorgerson
LivePhish.com Downloads
Phish live albums
Elektra Records live albums
Albums recorded at Markthalle Hamburg
1997 live albums